The International Fixed Calendar (also known as the IFC, Cotsworth plan, the Cotsworth calendar and the Eastman plan) is a proposed calendar reform designed by Moses B. Cotsworth, first presented in 1902. The solar calendar divides the year into 13 months of 28 days each. A type of perennial calendar, every date is fixed to the same weekday every year. Though it was never officially adopted at the country level, the entrepreneur George Eastman instituted its use at the Eastman Kodak Company in 1928, where it was used until 1989. While it is sometimes described as the 13-month calendar or the equal-month calendar, various alternative calendar designs share these features.

Rules 
The calendar year has 13 months with 28 days each, divided into exactly 4 weeks (13 × 28 = 364). An extra day added as a holiday at the end of the year (after December 28, i.e. equal December 31 Gregorian), sometimes called "Year Day", does not belong to any week and brings the total to 365 days. Each year coincides with the corresponding Gregorian year, so January 1 in the Cotsworth calendar always falls on Gregorian January 1.  Twelve months are named and ordered the same as those of the Gregorian calendar, except that the extra month is inserted between June and July, and called Sol. Situated in mid-summer (from the point of view of its Northern Hemisphere authors) and including the mid-year solstice, the name of the new month was chosen in homage to the sun.

Leap years in the International Fixed Calendar contain 366 days, and its occurrence follows the Gregorian rule. There is a leap year in every year whose number is divisible by 4, but not if the year number is divisible by 100, unless it is also divisible by 400. So although the year 2000 was a leap year, the years 1700, 1800, and 1900 were common years. The International Fixed Calendar inserts the extra day in leap years as June 29 - between Saturday June 28 and Sunday Sol 1.

Each month begins on a Sunday, and ends on a Saturday; consequently, every year begins on Sunday. Neither Year Day nor Leap Day are considered to be part of any week; they are preceded by a Saturday and are followed by a Sunday.

All the months look like this:

Today on this calendar will be .

The following shows how the 13 months and extra days of the International Fixed Calendar occur in relation to the dates of the Gregorian calendar:

*These Gregorian dates between March and June are a day earlier in a Gregorian leap year. March in the Fixed Calendar always has a fixed number of days (28), and includes the Gregorian February 29 (on Gregorian leap years).

History 
Lunisolar calendars, with fixed weekdays, existed in many ancient cultures, with certain holidays always falling on the same dates of the month and days of the week.

The simple idea of a 13-month perennial calendar has been around since at least the middle of the 18th century. Versions of the idea differ mainly on how the months are named, and the treatment of the extra day in leap year.

The "Georgian calendar" was proposed in 1745 by Reverend Hugh Jones, an American colonist from Maryland writing under the pen name Hirossa Ap-Iccim. The author named the plan, and the thirteenth month, after King George II of Great Britain. The 365th day each year was to be set aside as Christmas. The treatment of leap year varied from the Gregorian rule, however, and the year would begin closer to the winter solstice. In a later version of the plan, published in 1753, the 13 months were all renamed for Christian saints.

In 1849 the French philosopher Auguste Comte (1798–1857) proposed the 13-month Positivist Calendar, naming the months: Moses, Homer, Aristotle, Archimedes, Caesar, St Paul, Charlemagne, Dante, Gutenberg, Shakespeare, Descartes, Frederic and Bichat. The days of the year were likewise dedicated to "saints" in the Positivist Religion of Humanity. Positivist weeks, months, and years begin with Monday instead of Sunday. Comte also reset the year number, beginning the era of his calendar (year 1) with the Gregorian year 1789. For the extra days of the year not belonging to any week or month, Comte followed the pattern of Ap-Iccim (Jones), ending each year with a festival on the 365th day, followed by a subsequent feast day occurring only in leap years.

Whether Moses Cotsworth was familiar with the 13-month plans that preceded his International Fixed Calendar is not known. He did follow Ap-Iccim (Jones) in designating the 365th day of the year as Christmas. His suggestion was that this last day of the year should be designated a Sunday, and hence, because the following day would be New Year's Day and a Sunday also, he called it a Double Sunday. Since Cotsworth's goal was a simplified, more "rational" calendar for business and industry, he would carry over all the features of the Gregorian calendar consistent with this goal, including the traditional month names, the week beginning on Sunday (still traditionally used in US, but uncommon in Europe and in the ISO (International Organization for Standardization) week standard, starting their weeks on Monday), and the Gregorian leap-year rule.

To promote Cotsworth's calendar reform the International Fixed Calendar League was founded in 1923, just after the plan was selected by the League of Nations as the best of 130 calendar proposals put forward. Sir Sandford Fleming, the inventor and driving force behind worldwide adoption of standard time, became the first president of the IFCL. The League opened offices in London and later in Rochester, New York. George Eastman, of the Eastman Kodak Company, became a fervent supporter of the IFC, and instituted its use at Kodak. The International Fixed Calendar League ceased operations shortly after the calendar plan failed to win final approval of the League of Nations in 1937.

Advantages 
The several advantages of the International Fixed Calendar are mainly related to its organization.

 The subdivision of the year is very regular and systematic:
 Each month has exactly 4 weeks (28 days).
 Every day of the month falls on the same weekday in each month (e.g. the 17th always falls on a Tuesday).
 Every year has exactly 52 weeks divided among 13 months.
 Every year has 4 equal-length quarters of 91 days, each 13 weeks or  months long.
 The calendar is the same every year (perennial), unlike the annual Gregorian calendar, which differs from year to year. Hence, scheduling is easier for institutions and industries with extended production cycles.
 Movable holidays celebrated on the nth certain weekday of a month, such as U.S. Thanksgiving day, would be able to have a fixed date while keeping their traditional weekday.
 Statistical comparisons by months are more accurate, since all months contain exactly the same number of business days and weekends, likewise for comparisons by 13 week quarters.
 Although the average menstrual cycle in humans is often described as 28 days, there is variation and debate about this in the literature. Still, a consistent number of days in a month might prove beneficial for tracking periods and fertility with more ease.
The first mention of this argument can be found in September 1927 issue of The Outlook briefly mentioned an advantage to women without detail. A 2014 article in Bloomberg that explores that previous article cites an unnamed woman the author personally knew who sarcastically disagreed with such an advantage. Overall opinions of women on this calendar change as related to the menstrual cycle haven't been studied.
 Supporters of the International Fixed Calendar have argued that thirteen equal divisions of the year are superior to twelve unequal divisions in terms of monthly cash flow in the economy.

Disadvantages 
 While each quarter would be equal in length (13 weeks), thirteen is a prime number, placing all activities currently done on a quarterly basis out of alignment with the months.
 Some Jewish and Christian leaders opposed the calendar, as their tradition of worshiping every seventh day would result in either the day of the week of worship changing from year to year or eight days passing when Year Day or Leap Day occurs.
 The calendar is inconsistent with ISO 8601 regarding the first weekday of the week (Sunday vs. Monday), meaning major parts of the world would have to change their first weekday of the week.
 Birthdays, significant anniversaries, and other holidays would need to be recalculated, and would always be on the same day of the week. This could be problematic for public holidays that would fall on non-working days under the new system: for example, if a public holiday is celebrated on January 8, then under the International Fixed Calendar that holiday would always fall on a Sunday, which is already a non-working day, so compensatory leave would have to be given each year on January 9, which would essentially change the date of the holiday. This would be especially significant for any holidays or recurring events that take place on the 29th, 30th, or 31st days of the month where a new date would have to be determined entirely. However, in the case of federally observed holidays in the United States, those that would fall on a normal floating Monday could be observed to the previous Friday.
 A vast amount of administrative data (and the software that manages it) would have to be corrected and adjusted for the new dating system, potentially having to support both the IFC and the standard calendar date keeping systems for a period of time. This could be possible given large update rollouts to offer both date-keeping systems for a period of 1 year, finally switching to the final new system at the business parties' discretion.

See also
 Calendar reform
 ISO week date
 Leap week calendar
 Positivist calendar
 World Calendar

References

Notes

Citations

Sources

External links
 Cotsworth Calendar of George Eastman
 NUCAL New Universal Calendar Project
 International Fixed Calendar League
 CAL13 Fixed Calendar Note: this website is not canon and stopped updating in 2020

Proposed calendars
Specific calendars
1902 in science
1902 works